Niedernhall is a town in the Hohenlohe district, in Baden-Württemberg, Germany. It is situated on the river Kocher, 6 km west of Künzelsau, and 33 km northeast of Heilbronn.

Mayors after 1945

References

Hohenlohe (district)